Boano is an Austronesian language spoken in eastern Indonesia. It is spoken in Boano island, off the western end of Seram Island.

References

Central Maluku languages
Languages of the Maluku Islands